Lyal is a former rural locality in the City of Greater Bendigo, in the Australian state of Victoria. As of 2016, it is now part of the localities of Myrtle Creek and Kimbolton.

References

Towns in Victoria (Australia)
Suburbs of Bendigo